Similar to Pourbaix's diagram for the speciation of redox species as a function of the redox potential and the pH, ionic partition diagrams indicate in which an acid or a base are predominantly present in a biphasic system as a function of the Galvani potential difference 
between the two phases and the pH of the aqueous solution

Ionic partition diagram of an hydrophilic acid AH in a biphasic water/organic solvent system.

At a high aqueous pH, the acid is in the anionic form and can exist in both phases according to the Galvani potential difference. The Nernst equation for the distribution of the anion, ignoring the activity coefficients is written.

Thus, the separation limit between the anionic form in water and the organic solvent is a horizontal straight line.

The line separating the neutral acid in water and the anion Ao– in the organic phase is given by considering the aqueous acidity constant to give

As in the Pourbaix diagrams, we obtain a delimiting line that depends  
on the pH as shown below.

See also
ITIES
Lipophilicity
Partition coefficient

Electrochemistry